Río Tambo District is one of eight districts of the province Satipo of Peru.

See also
 Asháninka Communal Reserve
 Gran Pajonal
 Otishi National Park

References

1943 establishments in Peru
States and territories established in 1943